The 2011 Bella Cup was a professional tennis tournament played on outdoor clay courts. It was part of the 2011 ITF Women's Circuit. It took place in Toruń, Poland between June 27 and July 3, 2011.

WTA entrants

Seeds

Rankings are as of June 20, 2011.

Other entrants
The following players received wildcards into the singles main draw:
  Paula Kania
  Katarzyna Kapustka
  Katarzyna Kawa
  Monika Magusiak

The following players received entry from the qualifying draw:
  Nadya Kolb
  Anna Korzeniak
  Michaela Pochabová
  Chihiro Takayama

Champions

Singles

 Edina Gallovits-Hall def.  Stéphanie Foretz Gacon, 6–4, 6–3

Doubles

 Stéphanie Foretz Gacon /  Tatjana Malek def.  Edina Gallovits-Hall /  Andreja Klepač, 6–2, 7–5

References
Official Website
ITF Search 

2011 ITF Women's Circuit
Clay court tennis tournaments
Tennis tournaments in Poland
Sport in Toruń
2011 in Polish tennis